Phoenix Municipal Stadium is a baseball stadium, located in Phoenix, Arizona. It is often referred in short as Phoenix Muni. The stadium was built in 1964 and holds 8,775 people. It is currently the home to the Arizona State Sun Devils baseball program, having relocated to Phoenix Municipal Stadium at the start of their 2015 season.  It is the former spring training home to the Oakland A's, having played their home games from 1982 to 2014. The San Francisco Giants held spring training at the ballpark from 1964 to 1981, when they moved to Scottsdale Stadium.

Old Phoenix Municipal Stadium (1936–1963)
The original Phoenix Municipal Stadium was located at Central and Mohave streets, near downtown Phoenix. The ballpark opened in 1936 and had seating for around 3,000 spectators. Lights were installed by 1937.

The old stadium was used for various local baseball games, wrestling, and dog racing until 1946, when the New York Giants made arrangements to begin spring training there. The stadium required renovations and an injunction was filed against holding any further dog races at the stadium site to bring the Giants to town.

The Giants played their first game against major league opposition at the old stadium on March 9, 1947, defeating the Cleveland Indians 8-7 in front of a crowd of 8,000. The Phoenix Senators of the Arizona-Texas league also held games there in 1947.

The Giants renewed their agreement in April 1947 to stay at the stadium until 1950. They ultimately played there until 1963, when they moved to the new stadium.

Stadium History (1964–current)
The Phoenix city council approved construction of a new municipal stadium at Papago Park on June 4, 1962, to fully replace the old stadium. Plans for the stadium notably included six water fountains, as they were not originally included at the then-new Dodger Stadium. However, construction was delayed a year, in part because the stadium meant to be partially funded by selling the land the old stadium sat on - only one bidder appeared at the auction, and only bid on the parking lot, leaving a funding gap.

The council finally agreed to another approval on April 23, 1963, with the architect's proposed budget of $605,300.

The first spring training game was played on March 8, 1964, in which the Giants beat Cleveland, 6-2. Willie Mays hit the first home run at the park, in front of a crowd of 8,582. In attendance, for the dedication ceremonies, were Commissioner Ford Frick, National League President Warren Giles, and Giants owner Horace Stoneham.

The stadium hosted a "welcome home" rally for presidential candidate Barry Goldwater on October 31, 1964, shortly before the election. It was the first time the stadium had been filled to capacity.

The city of Phoenix installed an evaporative cooling system in the stadium in 1966.

The Phoenix Giants returned in 1966 as a Triple-A affiliate of the San Francisco Giants. That year the Giants signed a five-year lease on the stadium at $15,000/year to use Phoenix Muni for spring training, Triple-A games, and winter instructional league. They rebranded as the Firebirds in 1986.

In 1981, the San Francisco Giants signed an agreement to move to Scottsdale Stadium because the city of Phoenix did not provide requested renovations. The Oakland Athletics, who previously trained in Scottsdale, signed a seven-year lease to move to the stadium. The A's also renovated the dugouts and training complex.

The Phoenix Firebirds moved from the stadium in 1992 after entering discussions with the city of Scottsdale to play at the newly rebuilt Scottsdale Stadium. At the time of the move, the Firebirds' $10,000/year rent agreement did not come close to covering the city of Phoenix's maintenance expenses.

In 2003, the stadium underwent a $6.4 million renovation. The press box facilities were enclosed - at the time, the stadium had the only open-air facilities in the Cactus League. New dugouts, better signage, improved concourse areas with benches, shading, and a historical timeline were all added.

Arizona State Sun Devils
In 2013, The Arizona Board of Regents approved Arizona State University's 25-year lease to Phoenix Municipal Stadium. The stadium is 2.5 miles from Arizona State's main campus in Tempe (and as such, accessible via the Phoenix light rail system). The ASU baseball program has history at the site, as Reggie Jackson was the first college player to hit a home run out of Phoenix Municipal Stadium.  The Sun Devils started play in 2015 after which Packard Stadium, their former venue, was redeveloped to help pay for planned improvements to the ASU football facility, Sun Devil Stadium.

Arizona State had previously played selected games at the stadium in the 1960s, especially against their rival, the University of Arizona.

Other events
The stadium has also hosted Arizona Fall League games during the fall. It hosted the home games of the Phoenix Desert Dogs until their 2013 move to Glendale. The Arizona Diamondbacks’ rookie league team, the Phoenix Diamondbacks, also played in the stadium when the team played in the Arizona League. Several of the Arizona high school baseball championships are played there in early May.

Lighting

The stadium's light poles are the original light poles which were installed at the Polo Grounds in New York City in 1940. They served Polo Grounds until 1964, when the stadium was demolished. Horace Stoneham, the Giants owner, shipped the light poles to Phoenix.

Concerts
Phoenix Muni hosted outdoor concerts from major touring acts in the years before Desert Sky Pavilion, an outdoor amphitheatre, opened on the west side of Phoenix in 1990.

Black Sabbath and Blue Öyster Cult performed at the stadium during their Heaven & Hell Tour on July 25, 1980. The Police performed at the stadium during their Synchronicity Tour on September 8, 1983. AC/DC performed at the stadium during their Fly on the Wall Tour on October 17, 1985. Pink Floyd performed, on two consecutive nights, at the stadium during their A Momentary Lapse of Reason Tour on April 25–26, 1988.

See also
 List of NCAA Division I baseball venues

References

External links

Official website: Phoenix Municipal Stadium
Baseball Reference.com: Phoenix Municipal Stadium
Digital Ballparks: Phoenix Municipal Stadium
Ballpark Reviews: Phoenix Municipal Stadium

Arizona Fall League
Arizona State Sun Devils baseball
Arizona State University
Baseball venues in Arizona
Cactus League venues
High school baseball venues in the United States
Minor league baseball venues
Sports venues in Phoenix, Arizona
Oakland Athletics spring training venues
NAIA World Series venues
Arizona State Sun Devils